The 2019–20 season will see Glasgow Warriors compete in the competitions: the Guinness Pro14
and the European Champions Cup. Due to the coronavirus pandemic the season was postponed in May 2020. It continued with a very restricted season finale in August 2020.

Season overview

New logo, new website

The logo of Glasgow Warriors - apart from a very short spell when the club was deemed Glasgow Caledonians (on the merger with the Caledonia Reds) - was essentially the same for 23 years since the club turned professional. It was that of a Strathclyde warrior wearing a nasal spangenhelm helmet holding a rugby ball and a targe.

The new logo is still of a Strathclyde warrior with a spangenhelm helmet but the similarities end there. Only the warrior's head is now visible; the warrior is now bearded; there is no rugby ball; no targe. Instead in a nod to the old Glasgow District badge logo a saltire is in the background and the words Glasgow Warriors are part of the design below the Strathclyde warrior.

The whole impression is now much more like an American NHL or NFL design.

The club website also was updated. Rebranded with the new logo it was termed a 'mobile first' design given that 75% of its hits were from mobile phones.

Rennie's last season

On 19 November 2019 Glasgow Warriors announced that their Head Coach Dave Rennie will be leaving the club at the end of the 2019–20 season. Dave Rennie was headhunted by Rugby Australia after Michael Cheika announced he would quit on 31 December 2019 after the Australia team's lacklustre showing in the 2019 Rugby World Cup in Japan.

Next coach announced

The Glasgow Warriors board and the Scottish Rugby Union wasted no time in announcing Dave Rennie's successor in the Head Coach role at the club. The very next day from the Rennie announcement, on 20 November 2019, came the news that the Scotland forwards coach Danny Wilson would take over as Head Coach at Glasgow Warriors in the summer of 2020. Wilson took over on 1 June 2020.

Coronavirus pandemic

Due to the pandemic of the deadly COVID-19 strain of coronavirus, the Pro14 suspended all matches in March 2020 to the end of the season. The final, due to take place in Cardiff, was cancelled. If the final was to be played, the team with the highest league ranking points would instead host the match.

The 2019–20 season was extended due to coronavirus. It was to resume in August with teams playing 2 matches against the other teams in the Pro14 that had the same nationality. For Glasgow Warriors this meant that two matches were to be played against Edinburgh Rugby. More controversially, the Pro14 dropped the quarter finals which effectively meant that Glasgow Warriors would not make the play-offs in this season.

New co-captain pairing

With Callum Gibbins leaving the club, Danny Wilson announced that Fraser Brown would become the new co-captain of the club. Ryan Wilson retained his place as the other co-captain.

Team

Coaches

Head Coach:  Dave Rennie (to May 2020) then  Danny Wilson (from June 2020)
Assistant Coach:   Kenny Murray
Assistant Coach:   Jason O'Halloran
Forwards Coach:   John Dalziel
 Head Strength and Conditioning Coach:  Brad Mayo
 Asst. Strength and Conditioning Coach:  Liam Walshe 
 Asst. Strength and Conditioning Coach:  Jonathan Harris-Wright  
 Lead Performance Analyst: Greg Woolard
 Asst. Performance Analyst: Graham O'Riordan

Staff

 Managing Director: Nathan Bombrys
 Chairman: Charles Shaw
 Advisory Group: Walter Malcolm, Douglas McCrea, Alan Lees, Jim Preston, Paul Taylor
 Rugby Operations Manager: John Manson (to September 2019)
 Kit Manager & Masseur: Dougie Mills
 Clinical Manager and Team Physiotherapist: 
 Team Doctor: Dr. Jonathan Hanson
 Commercial Operations Manager: Alastair Kellock
 Communications Manager: Jeremy Bone
 Communications Asst: Jack Reid
 Content Producer: Graeme Thomson
 Marketing Insight Executive: Claire Scott
 Operations Manager: James Acheson
 Marketing and Partnerships Manager: Darroch Ramsay
 Partnership Sales Manager: Ross Curle
 Partnership Account Manager: Oliver Norman
 Partnership Account Manager: Jim Taylor
 Community Manager: Lindsey Smith
 Community Rugby Coach: Stuart Lewis

Squad

Scottish Rugby Academy Stage 3 players

These players are given a professional contract by the Scottish Rugby Academy. Although given placements they are not contracted by Glasgow Warriors. Players graduate from the Academy when a professional club contract is offered.

These players are assigned to Glasgow Warriors for the season 2019–20.

Academy players promoted in the course of the season are listed with the main squad.

  Euan McLaren - Prop
  Murphy Walker - Prop
  Cameron Henderson - Lock
  Marshall Sykes - Lock
  Ross Thompson - Fly-half 
  Ollie Smith - Centre
  Grant Hughes - Centre
  Robbie McCallum - Centre

Back up players

Other players used by Glasgow Warriors over the course of the season.

  Glenn Bryce (Scotland 7s) - Fullback
  Gavin Lowe (Scotland 7s) - Fullback
  Robbie Fergusson (Scotland 7s) - Centre
  Max McFarland (Scotland 7s) - Wing
  Alec Coombes (Scotland 7s) - Wing
  Kyle Rowe (Scotland 7s) - Wing
  Ross Graham (Watsonians) - Hooker
  Lars Morrice (Ayr) - Lock

2020-21 season players

Due to the extension of the 2019–20 season, two players signed for the 2020–21 season made appearances this season for Glasgow Warriors.

  Richie Gray - Lock
  Enrique Pieretto - Prop

Player statistics

During the 2019–20 season, Glasgow have used 52 different players in competitive games. The table below shows the number of appearances and points scored by each player.

Staff movements

Coaches

Personnel in
  Danny Wilson (Head Coach) from  Scotland (Forwards Coach) (from June 2020)
  Jonathan Harris-Wright  (Asst. Strength and Conditiong Coach) from  Bristol Bears Women

Personnel out
  Jonathan Humphreys to  Wales (Asst. Coach) 
  Mike Blair to  Scotland (Asst. Coach)
  George Petrakos released

Medical

Personnel in

Personnel out

  Nicola McGuire (lead physio and clinical manager)
  Gabrielle McCullough (rehab physiotherapist)

Staff

Personnel in

Personnel out

  John Manson to  Old Glory DC

Player movements

Academy promotions

Player transfers

In

Out
  Stuart Hogg to  Exeter Chiefs
  Jamie Bhatti to  Edinburgh
  Lewis Wynne to  London Scottish
  James Malcolm to  London Scottish
  Robbie Smith to  Bedford Blues
  Alex Dunbar released
 
  Lelia Masaga released
  Kaleem Barreto to  Stade Niçois (loan)
  David Tameilau to  San Diego Legion
  Jack Iscaro to  Old Glory DC
  Rory Hughes to  Leicester Tigers (loan)
  Matt Smith to  Edinburgh Rugby (loan)
  Charlie Capps to  Leicester Tigers (loan)
  Gordon Reid to  Northampton Saints

Competitions

Pre-season and friendlies

Glasgow Warriors lined up two pre-season games against Ulster.

Match 1

Ulster: Michael Lowry; Craig Gilroy, Matt Faddes, James Hume, Angus Kernohan; Billy Burns (C), Johnny Stewart; Kyle McCall,Adam McBurney, Ross Kane, Alan O’Connor, David O’Connor, Clive Ross, Marcus Rea, Greg JonesReplacements: John Andrew, Eric O’Sullivan, Tom O’Toole, Sam Carter, Kieran Treadwell, Matty Rea, Sean Reidy, Nick Timoney, David Shanahan, John Cooney, Angus Curtis, Luke Marshall, Graham Curtis, Ethan McIlroy

Glasgow Warriors: 1. Oli Kebble 2. Johnny Matthews 3. Adam Nicol 4. Tim Swinson (C) 5. Kiran McDonald 6. Matt Smith 7. Tom Gordon8. Adam Ashe 9. Sean Kennedy 10. Brandon Thomson 11. Ratu Tagive 12. Robbie Fergusson 13. Nick Grigg 14. Robbie Nairn 15. Glenn BryceReplacements: Pat O'Toole, Alex Allan, D'arcy Rae, George Thornton, Rob Harley, Lars Morrice, Cameron Henderson, Marshall Sykes, Chris Fusaro, Nick Frisby, Jamie Dobie, Ross Thompson, Paddy Kelly, Alec Coombes, Kyle Rowe, Max McFarland, Ollie Smith.

Match 2

Glasgow Warriors: 1. Oli Kebble, 2. Johnny Matthews, 3. D'arcy Rae, 4. Andrew Davidson, 5. Tim Swinson, 6. Rob Harley, 7. Chris Fusaro (c),8. Adam Ashe, 9. Nick Frisby, 10. Brandon Thomson, 11. Rory Hughes, 12. Stafford McDowall, 13. Huw Jones, 14. Kyle Steyn, 15. Glenn Bryce
Replacements: Grant Stewart, Alex Allan, Adam Nicol, Kiran McDonald, Bruce Flockhart, Sean Kennedy, Paddy Kelly, Ruaridh JacksonCharlie Capps, Callum Gibbins, Matt Fagerson, Jamie Dobie, Nick Grigg, Ratu Tagive, Gavin Lowe.

Ulster: Will Addison; Craig Gilroy, Matt Faddes, Stuart McCloskey, Rob Lyttle; Billy Burns (captain), John Cooney
Eric O’Sullivan, Rob Herring, Marty Moore, Kieran Treadwell, Sam Carter, Matty Rea, Sean Reidy, Nick Timoney
Replacements: John Andrew, Kyle McCall, Jack McGrath, Tom O’Toole, Alan O’Connor, Jordi Murphy, Greg Jones, David Shanahan,Bill Johnston, James Hume, Angus Curtis, Angus Kernohan, Michael Lowry.

Pro14

League table

Results

Round 1

Round 2

Round 3

Round 4

Round 5

Round 6

Round 7

Round 8 - 1872 Cup 1st Leg

Round 9 - 1872 Cup 2nd Leg

Round 10

Round 11

Round 12

Round 13

Coronavirus suspension

The subsequent matches scheduled were indefinitely suspended due to the Coronavirus pandemic.

Round 14

Round 15

Round 16

Round 17

Round 18

Round 19

Round 20

Round 21 - 1872 Cup 3rd Leg

Post-suspension matches

Round 14 - 1872 Cup 3rd leg

Round 15

Europe

In the European Rugby Champions Cup pool stage, Glasgow Warriors were placed as Tier 2 seeds and drawn with English sides Exeter Chiefs and Sale Sharks and French side La Rochelle.

Pool

Results

Round 1

Round 2

Round 3

Round 4

Round 5

Round 6

Warrior of the month awards

End of Season awards

Competitive debuts this season

A player's nationality shown is taken from the nationality at the highest honour for the national side obtained; or if never capped internationally their place of birth. Senior caps take precedence over junior caps or place of birth; junior caps take precedence over place of birth. A player's nationality at debut may be different from the nationality shown. Combination sides like the British and Irish Lions or Pacific Islanders are not national sides, or nationalities.

Players in BOLD font have been capped by their senior international XV side as nationality shown.

Players in Italic font have capped either by their international 7s side; or by the international XV 'A' side as nationality shown.

Players in normal font have not been capped at senior level.

A position in parentheses indicates that the player debuted as a substitute. A player may have made a prior debut for Glasgow Warriors in a non-competitive match, 'A' match or 7s match; these matches are not listed.

Tournaments where competitive debut made:

Crosshatching indicates a jointly hosted match.

Sponsorship
 SP Energy Networks - Title Sponsor and Community Sponsor
 Scottish Power - Official Kit

Official kit supplier
 Macron

Official kit sponsors
 Malcolm Group
 McCrea Financial Services
 Denholm Oilfield
 Ross Hall Hospital
 Story Contracting
 Leidos

Official sponsors
 The Famous Grouse
 Clyde Travel Management
 Harper Macleod
 Caledonia Best
 Eden Mill Brewery and Distillery
 David Lloyd Leisure
 Crabbie's
 CALA Homes
 Capital Solutions
 Martha's Restaurant
 Sterling Furniture

Official partners
 A.G. Barr
 Benchmarx
 Black & Lizars
 Cameron House
 Glasgow Airport
 Healthspan Elite
 KubeNet
 Mentholatum
 MSC Nutrition
 Smile Plus
 Lenco Utilities
 Scot JCB News Scotland
 HF Group
 Primestaff
 Village Hotel Club
 The Crafty Pig
 Kooltech
 Savills
 iPro Sports
 RHA

References

2019-20
2019–20 in Scottish rugby union
2019–20 Pro14 by team
2019–20 European Rugby Champions Cup by team